Maurice Flynn is an Irish journalist and presenter, best known for presenting BBC Points West and BBC East Midlands Today.

Early life

He was born in Ireland and moved to England when he was 10.

Career history

Maurice worked for Fox FM, Radio Oxford, ITV news and is best known for presenting for BBC News in the East Midlands and West regions of England.

He left the BBC in 2019.

Living people
BBC newsreaders and journalists
Year of birth missing (living people)